Paul Gibbs may refer to:

 Paul Gibbs (cricketer) (born 1965), New Zealand cricketer
 Paul Gibbs (footballer) (born 1972), English former footballer
 Paul Gibbs (rugby union) (born 1941), rugby union player who represented Australia
 Paul Gibbs (darts player) (born 1971), English darts player
 Paul Gibbs, founder of the Pais Movement